The Nemțișor is a left tributary of the river Neamț (Ozana) in Romania. It discharges into the Neamț in Lunca, near Vânători-Neamț.

Tributaries

The following rivers are tributaries to the river Nemțișor:

Left: Strungăria, Rusul Mic, Alunișu, Chilia, Huma, Iftimia, Cărbunele, Chiriac, Pârâul Sec, Bodei, Neamțu
Right: Paltinul (or Jacotele), Icoana, Afinișul, Nil, Zaplazul, Cardacul, Maghernița, Pârâul Puturos, Trapezia

References

Rivers of Romania
Rivers of Neamț County